Thomas P. Queally (born 8 October 1984 in  Dungarvan, County Waterford, Ireland) is a Thoroughbred horse racing jockey. He is best known as the regular jockey of Frankel. He was first jockey to leading trainer Sir Henry Cecil. Queally is best known for his association with the Cecil-trained pair Midday and Frankel.

Background
The son of Declan Queally, who trains a small string of Thoroughbreds in County Waterford, Queally was raised in Modeligo and attended to Dungarvan Christian Brothers School. He earned his first win on 13 April 2000 at Ireland's Clonmel Racecourse. 2009 was Tom Queally's breakthrough year, in which he won his first of five Group One races aboard Art Connoisseur in the Golden Jubilee Stakes at Royal Ascot. By 1 August, aboard Midday, he was winning his fourth Group One event, the Nassau Stakes at Goodwood; and on 7 November he again rode Midday to victory in the richest win of his career, the US$2 million Breeders' Cup Filly & Mare Turf at Santa Anita in California.

Riding career

Apprenticeship
The son of Irish trainer Declan Queally, the young Thomas was a southern area pony racing champion in Ireland and, aged 15, recorded his first win as a jockey on Larifaari at Clonmel on 13 April 2000.

After finishing his education, Queally joined the yard of the leading Irish trainer Aidan O'Brien, for whom he had been riding out at weekends whilst still at school.

A shock win in the 2003 renewal of the Group 3 Ballysax Stakes on Balestrini (beating O’Brien’s supposed first-string, the Derby hope Alberto Giacometti) could have been the springboard to success, however with only 11 winners on the board at a strike-rate of just 3% by late 2003, Queally informed O’Brien that he would look to try to further his career abroad.

Queally had ridden a winner for trainer David Elsworth when in England for a few weeks in January 2003 and his return to the UK (after a stint as a work rider both in the United States and New Zealand) was an instant success as, attached to the yard of legendary gambler and trainer Barney Curley, he took the apprentice title in his first full season in the UK in 2004 with 59 winners (66 in the calendar year).

Association with Henry Cecil
After riding 59 and 88 winners in 2006 and 2007 respectively, Queally recorded his maiden century in 2008, a year that also saw the beginning of his association with Newmarket-based trainer Sir Henry Cecil.

Queally rode more winners for Cecil (18) than for any other trainer in 2008 and, having seemingly been second jockey (behind Ted Durcan) to the trainer throughout the year, he was given the ride on Twice Over in the Champion Stakes, a move that appeared to herald a change in the pecking order, as the horse had been ridden by Durcan on four of his previous five starts that season.

Though never under contract as a stable jockey, Queally became first jockey to Cecil in 2009.  He won three Group 1 races for Cecil that season, though his first two successes at the highest level came for other trainers.  Firstly, Art Connoisseur for Michael Bell in the Group 1 Golden Jubilee Stakes at Royal Ascot on 20 June 2009, a ride which he came in for due to the unavailability of Bell’s two principal riders through suspension (Jamie Spencer) and injury (Hayley Turner), and then Fleeting Spirit for Jeremy Noseda in the Group 1 July Cup at Ascot the following month.

Queally’s association with Midday (who had finished a close 2nd in the Oaks the previous year) and Twice Over continued in 2010, with the horses providing Queally with five Group 1 victories, though Midday finished 2nd when bidding for a second win in the Filly and Mare Turf on her return to the Breeders’ Cup.  By then, the two-year-old Frankel had burst on to the scene, winning his first three starts (including the Group 2 Royal Lodge Stakes at Ascot) before running away with the Group 1 Dewhurst Stakes at Newmarket, part of a Group 1 double on the card for Queally and Cecil - the first for the trainer in his 40-year career - with Twice Over winning the Champion Stakes.

Immediately after the race, Frankel was shortened to odds-on favourite for the 2,000 Guineas at Newmarket the following May, with Queally labelling him "A superstar…very special".

After winning easily on his comeback race at Newbury on 16 April 2011 (the Group 3 Greenham Stakes), Frankel was sent off an odds-on favourite to win the 2,000 Guineas at Newmarket a fortnight later.

Having been expected to take a lead off his pacemaker in the race, Queally made all on Frankel to win by six lengths, the widest margin of victory since Tudor Minstrel in 1947.  Speaking after his first Classic win, Queally said, ""He’s made a show of them. The one thing this horse does is gallop - I didn't want to disappoint him, I wanted him to do what he enjoys and he showed them. The first thing you think is what speed are we going, because to him it feels like a cruising canter. He quickened up and went away."
However, the plaudits for his tactics at Newmarket turned to criticism after Frankel’s next start at Ascot, in the St James's Palace Stakes, where despite initially settling behind a strong pace set by his stablemate Rerouted, Queally sent Frankel to the lead well before the home turn and only just hung on to win.  Both trainer and jockey professed their surprise publicly at the criticism, with Queally dismissing claims the horse was tiring due to the unusual race tactics.  "He was starting to get a little fed up as he just does it so easily.  He's growing up all the time." Cecil confirmed he was satisfied with the ride given by Queally, stating, "The plan was to go before the bend and he sprinted away, but now he's getting wiser and when he thought he had the race won, he thought he'd done enough".
After the controversial tactics that led to the narrow victory at Ascot, Frankel was ridden to victory from the front in the Sussex Stakes at Goodwood, though Queally played down his role in the win, saying, "He was amazing and I’m just very fortunate to be playing a small part in it."
Further Group 1 victories for Queally and Cecil followed (Timepiece in the Falmouth Stakes and the evergreen Midday winning a third Nassau at Goodwood); but in the aftermath of Frankel’s easy win in the Group 1 Queen Elizabeth II Stakes (British Champion Mile), in which the horse lived up to his billing as the star attraction of the inaugural QIPCO British Champions Day, Queally was in no doubt about what had made his year, saying, "This is the people´s horse now.  If someone asked me to sum up my season, it would be one word, Frankel."  Queally finished 2011 with 100 winners and over £2,500,000 in prize-money.

In June 2012, Queally rode Frankel to the second and most devastating of his five Group One successes of the year: the Queen Anne Stakes at Royal Ascot, again over one mile, by 11 lengths. Stepped up to ten furlongs, Frankel cemented his reputation as one of the best racehorses of all time, in the International Stakes at York (22 August) and completed his career by winning the Champion Stakes. Queally enjoyed one other Group One triumph during 2012, riding Chachamaidee for Cecil to victory in the Matron Stakes at Leopardstown (8 September).

After the retirement of Frankel at the end of the 2012 season, and following Cecil's death in the spring of 2013, Queally continued to ride for the stable, led by the trainer's widow Lady Jane Cecil. For her he rode the winner of the Ebor Handicap at York (24 August).

Subsequent years have proved difficult for Queally. Wins on The Tin Man in the 2016 British Champions Sprint and 2017 Diamond Jubilee Stakes were rare top level victories. 2017 was the least prolific season of his time in Britain.

Major wins
 Great Britain
 2,000 Guineas – (1) Frankel (2011)
 Lockinge Stakes - (1) Frankel (2012)
 Queen Anne Stakes - (1) -Frankel (2012)
 St. James's Palace Stakes - (1)Frankel (2011)
 Sussex Stakes - (2) Frankel (2011,2012)
 International Stakes - (1)  Frankel (2012)
 Queen Elizabeth II Stakes - (1) Frankel (2011)
 Dewhurst Stakes - (1) Frankel(2010)
 Champion Stakes - (3) Twice Over (2009,2010), Frankel (2012)
 Diamond Jubilee Stakes - (2) Art Connoisseur (2009), The Tin Man (2017)
 Nassau Stakes - (3) - Midday (2009,2010,2011)
 Yorkshire Oaks - (1) Midday(2010)
 Eclipse Stakes - (1) Twice Over (2010)
 Falmouth Stakes - (1) Timepiece (2011)
 July Cup - (1) Fleeting Spirit (2009)
 British Champions Fillies and Mares Stakes - (1) Trick or Treat (2007)

 France
 Prix Vermeille - (1) Midday (2010)

 United States
 Breeders' Cup Filly & Mare Turf - (1) Midday (2009)

References

1984 births
Living people
Irish jockeys
Lester Award winners
Sportspeople from County Waterford
People from Dungarvan
British Champion apprentice jockeys